The Call of the Heart is a 1928 American silent Western film directed by Francis Ford and written by Basil Dickey and Gardner Bradford. The film stars Dynamite the Dog, Joan Alden, Edmund Cobb, William Steele, Maurice Murphy and George Plues. The film was released on January 29, 1928, by Universal Pictures.

Cast    
 Dynamite the Dog as Dynamite 
 Joan Alden as Molly O'Day
 Edmund Cobb as Jerry Wilson
 William Steele as Dave Crenshaw 
 Maurice Murphy as Josh O'Day
 George Plues as Henchman
 Frank Baker as Henchman
 Owen Train as Henchman

References

External links
 

1928 films
1928 Western (genre) films
Universal Pictures films
Films directed by Francis Ford
American black-and-white films
Silent American Western (genre) films
1920s English-language films
1920s American films